Schellbourne, formerly known as Fort Schellbourne and Schell Creek Station is a ghost town located in the Schell Creek Range in White Pine County in Nevada, United States, located  north of Ely.  The town was a stopover along the Central Overland Route, Pony Express and original routing of the Lincoln Highway. It is today Nevada Historical Marker number 51. The site was listed on the National Register of Historic Places in 1972.  Its boundaries were increased in 1977.

History
Schellbourne is named for Major A. J. Schell, who was in charge of troops responsible for protecting the Butterfield Overland Mail. The location was once a Shoshone Indian village.  It became an Overland Stage and Mail stop in 1859, and a Pony Express station in 1860 as Schell Creek station.  The Overland Telegraph came through in 1861.  It was briefly known as Fort Schellbourne in 1862 when troops camped here to counter Indian harassment of the stages and mails.

In the 1870s, Schellbourne became a mining town, with about 500 inhabitants.  The Schellbourne post office was in operation from December 1871 until October 1925.

It declined after the Central Pacific Railroad was completed in 1869, to the north.  Then it revived as a mining camp in 1871 after gold discoveries nearby.

Nowadays it is well preserved ghost town on a private ranch. It is listed as Nevada Historical Marker 51.

References

Buildings and structures completed in 1860
Schellbourne
Buildings and structures in White Pine County, Nevada
Pony Express stations
1860 establishments in Utah Territory
Schellbourne
National Register of Historic Places in White Pine County, Nevada
Formerly Used Defense Sites in Nevada
Unincorporated communities in White Pine County, Nevada
Great Basin National Heritage Area
Pony Express